The Sitges Film Festival is an annual film festival held in Sitges, Spain, specialized in fantasy and horror films, of which it is considered one of the world's foremost international festivals. Established in 1968, the festival takes place every year, usually in early October.

The 55th edition of the festival will be held from October 6 to 16, 2022. This year, in the 22nd edition of the Awards 15 film schools and universities around Catalonia, which have submitted a total of 32 audiovisual works, will also participate.

Venues 
The main venue of the Sitges Film Festival is the Auditori (Auditorium), located in the Hotel Melià Sitges (in the Port d'Aiguadolç area), which has a capacity of 1,384 seats. As of 2020, other venues are: Cine El Retiro (El Retiro Cinema), Cine Prado (Prado Cinema), Brigadoon - L'escorxador (a beautiful modernista building), Tramuntana (another cinema hall in Hotel Melià), Platja de Sant Sebastià (Sant Sebastià Beach), the emblematic Palau de Maricel (villa), Hort de Can Falç (Can Falç Garden) and Edifici Miramar (Miramar Building).

Directors 
The director of the festival since 2001 is Àngel Sala Corbí, who succeeded Roc Villas i Ventura (1999-2000), and Àlex Gorina i Macià (1994-1998) before him, etc.

Awards
Since 1971 the festival has given awards to the best films, actors, and filmmakers.

The Gorilla (Official Fantastic Section) are the festival's main awards. Award-winners are selected by an international jury. These awards are:
Best Feature-Length Film
Best Director
Best Actor
Best Actress
Best Screenplay
Best Special Effects
Best Cinematography
Best Original Score
Special Jury Prize
Grand Audience Award for Best Motion Picture (Official Fantastic Selection)
Best Fantastic Genre Short Film

The festival also presents:
The José Luis Guarner Critics’ Award
Citizen Kane Award for the Best Debut Feature (Best New Director)
The Noves Visions (New Visions) Award 
The Carnet Jove Jury Award (film selected by a youth jury)
The Grand Honorary Award (for Lifetime Achievement in Cinema)
The Anima't Awards for Best Animated Short and Feature Film
The Màquina del Temps (Time Machine) Award, given to individuals from the fantasy world film genre
The Midnight X-Treme Award, for the best motion picture from the special screenings (selected by the Carnet Jove Jury)
and a few others...

Winners

See also
 European Fantastic Film Festivals Federation

Other genre film festivals
 Fantasporto
 Fantasia International Film Festival
 Fantastic Fest
 Screamfest Horror Film Festival
 Brussels International Festival of Fantasy Film
 Puchon International Fantastic Film Festival
 Dead by Dawn
 Fantafestival
 International Horror and Sci-Fi Film Festival
 New York City Horror Film Festival
 Toronto After Dark Film Festival
 TromaDance
 Lusca Fantastic Film Fest

References

External links
 

Film festivals in Catalonia
Fantasy and horror film festivals
1967 establishments in Spain
1976 establishments in Catalonia
Recurring events established in 1967
Annual events in Catalonia
Sitges
Film festivals established in 1967
Autumn events in Spain